Robert Tinotenda Mugabe Jr (born 1991 or 1992) is a Zimbabwean basketball player, fashion label owner, political campaigner, and the son of Robert Mugabe and Grace Mugabe.

Early life and education 

He studied in the United Arab Emirates.

Career and politics 
At the age of 25, Mugabe played for the Zimbabwe men's national basketball team. He was previously part of the nation's under-18 team.

Robert Mugabe, with his brother Chatunga, launched the xGx clothing label in Johannesburg, in December 2017. The brothers had previously launched Trip Life music-entertainment company. Mugabe is also a brand ambassador for SVG fashion brand.

In 2022, Mugane was a member of Emmerson Mnangagwa's political campaign team. He is a member of ZANU-PF political party.

Personal life 
In May 2022, Mugabe was admitted to a Singapore hospital after a lung collapse from pneumothorax. In September the same year, he was injured after crashing his Range Rover vehicle in the Eastern Highlands. In February 2023, Mugabe was arrested, facing allegations of property damage and assault of a police officer. The prosecution was paused soon after a court appearance in Harare.

Mugabe is noted for his lavish lifestyle. At times, he has lived in South Africa.

See also 

 Mugabe family

References 

Living people
Zimbabwean emigrants to South Africa
Robert Mugabe
Zimbabwean basketball players
Zimbabwean businesspeople
Zimbabwean political people
Company founders
Fashion designers
1990s births